Rebekka Karijord, born 19 November 1976 in Sandnessjøen, is a Norwegian born, Stockholm, Sweden-based musician and composer.   After creating music for over 30 films theatre and dance performances, Karijord recorded The Noble Art of Letting Go in 2009. It was released in Scandinavia in the Fall of 2009 and Europe in 2010.  There were also song placements on BBC and ABC Television, and the world touring nouveau cirque Cirkus Cirkör performance Wear it Like a Crown being based upon Karijord's song of the same title.

In between composing projects, Karijord wrote and recorded We Become Ourselves in 2012, releasing it across Europe and UK in the late Fall of 2012 and early winter 2013.  The record was selected as Mojo Magazines record of the month under the category world in November 2012 as well as top 10 records of 2012.  Several European tours followed the release of We Become Ourselves.  
In January 2014 Karijord released Music for Film and Theatre, a largely instrumental compilation of songs that she composed under the years 2009–2013 for film and theatre projects.

Discography
Rebekka - Neophyte (2004)
Rebekka and the Mystery Box - Good or Goodbye (2006)
Rebekka Karijord - The Noble Art of Letting Go (2009) - LilFacit Records
Rebekka Karijord - We Become Ourselves (2012) - Control Freak Kitten Records / Sony Music
Rebekka Karijord - Music for Film and Theatre (2014) - Control Freak Kitten Records
Rebekka Karijord - Mother Tongue (2017) - Control Freak Kitten Records

External links
 
 www.rebekkakarijord.com

Living people
1976 births
Norwegian composers
Norwegian women composers
Norwegian expatriates in Sweden
21st-century women musicians
People from Alstahaug